Guanaceví is a town located in the northwest of the Mexican state of Durango. As of 2015, the town of Guanaceví had a population of 2,908. It serves as the municipal seat of the municipality of Guanaceví, which in the 2015 Census had a population of 9,851. It is filled with mines that contain many minerals such as gold, silver, and brass. It has many food traditions that includes sopes, enchiladas, chapaneco, tezhuino, queso, chiles rellenos, etc.

Early history of this town can be found in Perez de Ribas Paginas, book3.

References 

Andres Perez de Ribas Historia de los triunfos de Nueva Santa Fe [1646] 1944 Mexico City 3vols.

External links
https://web.archive.org/web/20061124110015/http://www.e-local.gob.mx/work/templates/enciclo/durango/mpios/10009a.htm
https://web.archive.org/web/20071019234510/http://www.municipioguanacevi.gob.mx/

Populated places in Durango